Spener may refer to:

 Philipp Jacob Spener (1635–1705), German Lutheran theologian
  (1678–1714), German anatomist
  (1684–1730), German historian
  (1749–1827), German publisher, bookseller, publicist, editor of the 
  (1760–1825)

References 

German-language surnames